Akintunde Warnock  (born October 23, 1971), better known as Akintunde or Ak, is a comedian, writer, director and actor from the United States.

Warnock first realised that he wanted to be a comedian whilst he was a pupil at Raymont Junior Academy in Savannah, Georgia.  He was a fat child who was bullied and he enjoyed the laughter of his classmates when he mocked his tormentors.

After working as a barber he began a full-time career as a stand-up comedian in 1995. He travelled the United States performing all over the country, on BET's Comicview, and in the Turner South series That Comedy Show. He wrote material for the television show It's Showtime at the Apollo, and comedians Monique and Chris Tucker.

He became a Christian in 1999 and adapted Atlanta Bishop Eddie Long's book I Don't Want Delilah, I Need You into a movie screenplay.

He made a documentary on black comedians called No Joke, which he co-produced with comedian J. Anthony Brown from the Tom Joyner Morning Show. The documentary features life on the road with black comedians such as Steve Harvey, Renaldo Ray and Paul Mooney.

Warnock and his wife, Eunissa, have five children: Akintunde II (born 1994); Jaleel (1996); Deja (1997); Khalia (August 2000); Elijah Prince (November 2002). They live in Columbia, South Carolina.

Discography

 Brutally Honest (2004)
Christian Comedy Live (2006)
It's Time to Laugh, Vol.1 (2009)

References

External links

 Official Akintunde Website

American male screenwriters
African-American male comedians
American male comedians
1971 births
Living people
Writers from Savannah, Georgia
American people of Nigerian descent
American people of Yoruba descent
Yoruba comedians
Comedians from Georgia (U.S. state)
Screenwriters from Georgia (U.S. state)
People from Irmo, South Carolina
Screenwriters from South Carolina
21st-century American comedians
21st-century American screenwriters
21st-century American male writers
21st-century African-American writers
20th-century African-American people
African-American male writers